Might and Magic VII: For Blood and Honor is a role-playing game for Windows published in 1999 by 3DO and developed by New World Computing; it was re-released in 2011 on GOG.com. The game follows on from both the events of Heroes of Might and Magic III (a prequel to For Blood and Honor), and those of Might and Magic VI: The Mandate of Heaven. Players form a party of four characters who win a castle in a scavenger hunt and soon become embroiled in political events on the continent of Antagarich, on the world of Enroth, before eventually choosing one of two paths and working alongside a number of characters, whose storyline continues on from the events of Might and Magic III: Isles of Terra. The game, Might and Magic VIII: Day of the Destroyer is a sequel to Blood and Honor.

Gameplay
While much of the gameplay remains the same as it was in Mandate of Heaven, a few improvements and changes were made to a number of prominent parts of the game. Character creation in Blood and Honor received an update from its predecessor by now allowing players to choose a race for each character out of the following four - Dwarves, Elves, Goblins and Humans - while also adding in three new classes to choose from alongside the pre-existing ones - Thief, Monk and Ranger. The skill system also received a major change, with the inclusion of new skills and a new level of expertise - Grandmaster - but also becoming more restrictive than that of the previous title; a character's class not only determines what skills they can learn but now also puts a cap on the level of expertise it can be trained to, meaning that while a Thief could become a Master of the Sword Skill, a Knight can train the skill up to Grandmaster. The change to the skill system, also affects the Magic system of the game, in that while some spells have been removed and new ones included, a character's level of expertise in a school of magic determines what spells can be learned, with weaker spells gaining more bonuses upon training to higher levels of expertise; an example of this new system comes with the "Fly" spell, which only Masters of Air magic can learn, but who can gain the benefit of not draining magic points upon attaining Grandmaster of Air. Along with these changes, the game includes an update to the graphical appearances of enemy sprites, character models and items.

Beside the changes, the game features new additions. The first is the inclusion of making two notable choices, in regards to the political conflict between the elves and humans within the story. While one choice encountered is entirely optional but can determine the fate of their party's realm if completed within a set time limit, the other has a more profound impact on the story and is mandatory; the player has to make a decision on this choice in order to progress in the game's story. This ultimate choice, in regards to finding a successor to Harmondale's Arbiter (the game's version of the Seer from the previous title), defines which path - Light or Dark - the party takes for the rest of the game, affecting certain aspects. Along with a minor but permanent change of colour on the game display (white for Light, black for Dark), a number of additional quests become available for their chosen alignment, while the city of that respective path is friendly to the party and their rival is not; if Light is chosen, guards in all Darkness-aligned towns become hostile towards the player and vice versa. One major noticeable effect of this choice comes down to the Promotion quest system; while characters can earn a promotion to a more advanced tier of their chosen class without taking a path, proceeding to the second and final tier does requires such a choice, effectively leaving such promotions unavailable until later in the game, while determining what sort of quest they get in order to earn it and the title they receive as a result. For example, a Paladin who becomes a Crusader can later become either a Hero if they choose the Light path or a Villain if they chose the Dark path.

The other major addition to the game is the minigame of Arcomage, which is tied into two side-quests, in which players have to obtain a set of Arcomage cards and then play the game in all of the taverns in Antagarich. When playing the minigame, both sides having their towers pre-set to a certain height, are given a wall, and then achieve one of two specific victory conditions set out by each tavern: either get a tower to a certain height, or destroy your opponent's tower. Players take turns to either play a card, or discard it, until one side achieves victory via one of the conditions set out.

Story

Setting
The game takes place on the world of Enroth, across the continent of Antagarich. The continent is divided up into several regions, including the elven lands of Avlee and Tularean Forest, the barrens of Deyja which house the necromancer stronghold of The Pit, the swamps and snow-capped mountains of Tatalia, the Bracada desert and the cloud city of Celeste, Mount Nighon, the islands of Emerald Isle and Evernmorn, the dwarven lands of the Barrow Downs, the human kingdom of Erathia, and the realm of Harmondale. By the time the game starts, the aftermath of the war in Heroes of Might and Magic III has led the elves of Avlee and the humans of Erathia in a political dispute on the boundaries of Harmondale, with tensions slowly increasing.

Plot
Following the events of Might and Magic III, the eight heroes of Terra - Sir Caneghem, Crag Hack, Maximus, Resurectra, Dark Shade, Kastore, Robert the Wise and Tolberti - attempted to pilot a seedship known as the "Lincoln" in pursuit of the Guardians, Corak and Sheltem, who were en route for the world of Xeen. However, an unknown problem occurred that caused the Terrans to drift off-course and eventually crash-land in the seas near Antagarich, on Enroth. At around the same time, two war parties, one of elves and the other of goblins, break off fighting each other when the eight heroes emerge from the sea in strange outfits. Both sides witness the heroes arguing over their mission before eventually splitting up into two separate parties and departing. While elves report what they saw to their leader, Gavin Magnus, the Immortal King of Celeste, the goblins report the same thing to  Archibald Ironfist, the brother of King Roland and leader of the Necromancers of Deyja after forging an alliance with them shortly after fleeing from Enroth, when the adventurers of Might and Magic VI, taking residence in Antagarich to plan his next move.  Intrigued with what they hear, the pair order a search for the strange beings.

Meanwhile, on the Emerald Isles, the wealthy Lord Markham organises a scavenger hunt, with first prize being the deeds to the Castle of Harmondale and its surrounding lands. A new party of four player characters takes up the challenge and wins the competition, becoming the new Lords of Harmondale, only to discover upon arriving to their new home that the castle fell into a dreadful state of dilapidation. After clearing out some unwelcome guests, and getting help from Hothfarr IX, king of the dwarves of Stone City, to repair their castle, the new Lords soon return to their restored castle only to find diplomats waiting for them, each representing either the human kingdom of Erathia or the elven kingdom of Avlee and asking the party to meet each kingdom's leader: King Eldrich Parson, leader of the elves of Avlee, and Queen Catherine Ironfist, leader of the humans of Erathia. Through them, the party learn why Markham was offering Harmondale as a prize; unbeknown to them, their new home lay in disputed territory that both Avlee and Erathia had laid a claim on, and has now resulted in both battles between both kingdoms, despite the efforts of an Arbiter in the matter, Judge Grey.

Having noticed that Castle Harmondale had been restored by the party, both Catherine and Eldrich each asks them to help in their dispute against the other by performing a feat of espionage that can gain them an advantage. The party find themselves either doing so within a period of a month, or letting their rival know of what they were asked to do.  Eventually a major fight between the two kingdoms erupts in the Tularen Forest over who gets to take an important artifact - Gryphonheart's Trumpet. In managing to get it before the conflict ends (if the player arrives in time to learn of the battle), the party face the decision of handing it over to one of the leaders, granting that kingdom victory in the conflict, or pass it on to Grey, thus granting Harmondale independence from both kingdoms. A few months after the war began, Judge Grey passes away from natural causes, leaving the party to find a suitable candidate. Faced to decide between either Judge Fairweather, a representative of the wizards of Bracada, or Judge Sleen, a representative of the necromancers of Deyja, the party's choice eventually decides on the outcome of the war. If Judge Sleen is chosen, the war worsens and the necromancers use the corpses of the fallen to make an undead army, but if Judge Fairweather is chosen, the humans and elves come to a peaceful agreement and thus end their war over Harmondale. Following this, the party go to the city of their chosen "path" and meet with that city's leader, finding themselves undertaking a trial before meeting with their four advisers. Upon completing the trial, they soon find themselves working on a series of tasks for the advisers, who eventually reveal themselves as off-worlders and the Terrans that arrived on Enroth.

What was witnessed by the war parties of elves and goblins was not the full story - when the Terrans emerged from the sea, they soon fell into disagreement over their mission. While Resurectra, Robert the Wise, Crag Hack and Sir Caneghem, wanted to build a forgotten Gate created by the Ancients, capable of allowing them to reach the two warring Guardians and perhaps even the enigmatic Ancients themselves, the others, Kastore, Tolberti, Dark Shade and Maximus, wanted to revive the Ancients' broken Heavenly Forge, capable of creating futuristic weaponry beyond compare, and use it to conquer Enroth.  Eventually, the two groups separated into two parties - one "good" and one "evil" - and began exploring Antagarich, but not before each party set up a trap on the "Lincoln" to prevent the other side from gaining control over it. While Kastore led the "evil" party and eventually secured places in Deyja beside Archibald in order to continue to research a way to revive the Forge, Resurectra led the "good" party and formed an alliance with Gavin in order to complete the Gate, with both finding that needed champions to get control of the seedship and recover an important device known as Oscillation Overthruster, to complete their instrument of victory.

Before the party can retrieve the device needed by Resurectra/Kastore, they first find themselves having do battle against the diabolical Kreegans (the devil-like race that featured in Might and Magic VI) and eliminate their monarch, Xenofex. Travelling to the Land of the Giants, the party soon receive a message from Archibald upon arrival, informing them that (regardless of their alignment) Kastore deposed him and took control of the Necromancers. Having become weary and guilt-ridden for his past crimes, he asks the players to enter the Kreegan's fortress and rescue Roland, in the hopes it will lift a death sentence put on him by Catherine. Rescuing Roland and defeating Xenofex, the party watch as the Ironfists reunite, before Archibald renounces his claim to Enroth's throne and departs in peace (which leads on into Heroes of Might and Magic III: Armageddon's Blade).

With the Kreegan dealt a blow, the party soon receive wetsuits from Resurectra/Kastore, and venture into the "Lincoln" battling droids and finally retrieving the Osciliation Overthruster. The story ends depending on the party's chosen alignment. If Light, Resurectra's party uses the Overthruster to complete the Gate, thus being transported to a neighbouring space station where the party meets Corak (that is, a second C.O.R.A.K. module Guardian - another appeared throughout Might and Magic II-V) who reveals the nature of the Ancients' war. If dark, Kastore's party uses it to revive the Heavenly Forge, thus producing an endless supply of futuristic weaponry capable of dominating the world. This ending was planned to be canonical, leading into the events of Heroes of Might and Magic III: Armageddon's Blade.

Reception

The game received favorable reviews according to the review aggregation website GameRankings. Aaron John Loeb of NextGen said, "If you have a burning hunger for a new RPG, Might and Magic VII offers a fine quick fix, but you don't get anything more than you'd expect."

The game was nominated for Computer Games Strategy Plus and Computer Gaming Worlds 1999 "Role-Playing Game of the Year" awards, both of which ultimately went to Planescape: Torment.

References

External links

Might & Magic 7 Shrine
Sergey "GrayFace" Rozhenko Homepage Unofficial patch repairing various problems and adding few new features

1999 video games
Might and Magic
New World Computing games
Role-playing video games
The 3DO Company games
Video games developed in the United States
Video games featuring protagonists of selectable gender
Video games scored by Paul Romero
Video game sequels
Video games with alternate endings
Windows games
Windows-only games
Science fantasy video games
First-person party-based dungeon crawler video games